Wykham Park Academy is a coeducational academy school situated on Ruskin Road, in the Easington ward of Banbury, Oxfordshire, England. The school has a sixth form. Formerly Banbury School, it has been an academy since 2012, originally under the name of Banbury Academy.  In September 2018, the school changed its name to Wykham Park Academy Banbury.

History
Wykham Park Academy used to be three separate schools. These were:

Stanbridge Hall (the former grammar school)
Wykham Hall
Broughton Hall

Before the school's name was changed to Banbury Grammar School in 1946, it was called Banbury County School and was a mixed school for boys and girls from the ages of 11 to 18/19. It was founded in 1893. Wykham Hall was built in about 1953 and was called Easington Modern Boys' School. When the schools merged they became Banbury School, with Harry Judge as the founding Principal. The school became an academy, originally called Banbury Academy, on 1 August 2012.

Banbury and Drayton merger proposal
In April 2003, there was a proposal which suggested that Banbury School and Drayton School should be merged as one school, while Blessed George Napier Roman Catholic School, which is situated next to Banbury School, would move to the site of Drayton School. The idea met with opposition from many in the local community because it would have meant an increase in journey time for those students who attend Drayton School. Many argued that it would mean a loss of parental choice and would mean that Banbury School would lose its identity. As a result, the proposed merger was rejected.

New building programme
Oxfordshire County Council spent £6 million on a new two-storey, V-shaped building to replace the old Stanbridge building. The New Stanbridge building was officially opened on 13 March 2009 by Michael Gove MP, Shadow Secretary of State for Children, Schools and Families and includes the English, Maths, Humanities, Languages, RE, IT and Business departments, with 28 classrooms. The old building and some associated land was subsequently sold, causing local controversy.

Banbury Area Sixth Form
The sixth form serves students from the town of Banbury and surrounding villages. It offers over 30 A-Level courses as well as the option to resit Maths and English at GCSE. The sixth form has undergone extensive development and it now contains a common room, study area and computer suite for use by all sixth formers, plus classrooms and offices in the original sixth form block. The students play an active role in the way that the sixth form is run in the form of a student council, led by the principal students with representatives from each mentor group. They organise social events such as the end of year prom and charity events, most recently the Children in Need appeal.

Notable alumni
Faisal Khalid (born 1985), cricketer

References

Academies in Oxfordshire
Secondary schools in Oxfordshire